Atomic Kitten is the American debut album by Atomic Kitten. The girl group had previously been successful in Europe, Oceania and Asia and already released Right Now and Feels So Good, which both went to number one on the UK Albums Chart, however there had not been any release in the United States. It was therefore decided to make an album consisting of tracks from both previous albums.

Unlike Europe, Oceania and Asia, the success of Atomic Kitten in the United States was non-existent. The American music market is difficult for European acts and therefore the girl group teamed up with Disney to include "The Tide Is High" in The Lizzie McGuire Movie starring Hilary Duff. However the album failed to chart on the Billboard 200.

This resulted in Atomic Kitten focusing their attention on Europe, Oceania and Asia where they already were an established act. It was also released in New Zealand, where both Right Now and Feels So Good were successful, and peaked at number 7.

The album solely contained the radio versions of their single releases.

Track listing

Notes
 denotes additional producer
 denotes vocal producer

Charts

Weekly charts

Year-end charts

References

External links
 Official website

2003 compilation albums
Atomic Kitten albums
Virgin Records compilation albums